George Westinghouse Jr. (October 6, 1846 – March 12, 1914) was an American entrepreneur and engineer based in Pennsylvania who created the railway air brake and was a pioneer of the electrical industry, receiving his first patent at the age of 19. Westinghouse saw the potential of using alternating current for electric power distribution in the early 1880s and put all his resources into developing and marketing it. This put Westinghouse's business in direct competition with Thomas Edison, who marketed direct current for electric power distribution. In 1911 Westinghouse received the American Institute of Electrical Engineers's (AIEE) Edison Medal "For meritorious achievement in connection with the development of the alternating current system." He founded the Westinghouse Electric Corporation in 1886.

Early years
George Westinghouse was born in 1846 in Central Bridge, New York (see George Westinghouse Jr. Birthplace and Boyhood Home), the son of Emeline (Vedder) and George Westinghouse Sr., a machine shop owner. His ancestors came from Westphalia in Germany, who first moved to England and then emigrated to the US. The name had been Anglicized from Westinghausen.

From his youth, Westinghouse was talented with machinery and business. At the breakout of the Civil War in 1862, the 15-year-old Westinghouse enlisted in the New York National Guard and served until his parents urged him to return home. The following year, he persuaded his parents to allow him to re-enlist, whereupon he joined Company M of the 16th New York Cavalry and earned promotion to the rank of corporal. In December 1864 he resigned from the Army to join the Navy, serving as Acting Third Assistant Engineer on the gunboat  through the end of the war. After his military discharge in August 1865, he returned to his family in Schenectady and enrolled at Union College. He lost interest in the curriculum and dropped out in his first term.

Westinghouse was 19 years old when he created his first invention, a rotary steam engine. He also devised the Westinghouse Farm Engine. At age 21 he invented a "car replacer", a device to guide derailed railroad cars back onto the tracks, and a reversible frog, a device used with a railroad switch to guide trains onto one of two tracks.

Air brakes 

At about this time, he witnessed a train wreck where two engineers saw one another, but were unable to stop their trains in time using the existing brakes. Brakemen had to run from car to car, on catwalks atop the cars, applying the brakes manually on each car.

In 1869, at age 22, Westinghouse invented a railroad braking system using compressed air. The Westinghouse system used a compressor on the locomotive, a reservoir and a special valve on each car, and a single pipe running the length of the train (with flexible connections) which both refilled the reservoirs and controlled the brakes, allowing the engineer to apply and release the brakes simultaneously on all cars. It is a failsafe system, in that any rupture or disconnection in the train pipe will apply the brakes throughout the train. It was patented by Westinghouse on October 28, 1873.

Westinghouse pursued many improvements in railway signals (which then used oil lamps). In 1881 he founded the Union Switch and Signal Company to manufacture his signaling and switching inventions.

Electric power distribution

Westinghouse's interests in gas distribution and telephone switching  led him to become interested in the then-new field of electrical power distribution in the early 1880s. Electric lighting was a growing business with many companies building outdoor direct current (DC) and alternating current (AC) arc lighting based street lighting systems. At the same time, Thomas Edison was launching the first DC electric utility designed to light homes and businesses with his patented incandescent bulb. In 1884, Westinghouse started developing his own DC domestic lighting system and hired physicist William Stanley to work on it. Westinghouse became aware of the new European alternating current systems in 1885 when he read about them in the UK technical journal Engineering. AC had the ability to be "stepped up" in voltage by a transformer for distribution and then "stepped down" by a transformer for consumer use, allowing large centralized power plants to supply electricity long distance in cities with more dispersed populations. This was an advantage over the low voltage DC systems being marketed by Thomas Edison's electric utility which had a limited range due to the low voltages used. Westinghouse saw AC's potential to achieve greater economies of scale as way to build a truly competitive system instead of simply building another barely competitive DC lighting system using patents just different enough to get around the Edison patents.

In 1885 Westinghouse imported a number of Gaulard–Gibbs transformers and a Siemens AC generator, to begin experimenting with AC networks in Pittsburgh. Stanley, assisted by engineers Albert Schmid and Oliver B. Shallenberger, developed the Gaulard–Gibbs transformer design into the first practical transformer. In 1886, with Westinghouse's backing, Stanley installed the first multiple-voltage AC power system in Great Barrington, Massachusetts, a demonstration lighting system driven by a hydroelectric generator that produced 500 volts AC stepped down to 100 volts to light incandescent bulbs in homes and businesses. That same year, Westinghouse formed the "Westinghouse Electric & Manufacturing Company"; in 1889 he renamed it as "Westinghouse Electric Corporation".

War of currents

The Westinghouse company installed 30 more AC-lighting systems within a year and by the end of 1887 it had 68 alternating current power stations to Edison's 121 DC-based stations. This competition with Edison led in the late 1880s to what has been called the "war of currents" with Thomas Edison and his company joining in with a spreading public perception that the high voltages used in AC distribution were unsafe. Edison even suggested a Westinghouse AC generator be used in the State of New York's new electric chair. Westinghouse also had to deal with an AC rival, the Thomson-Houston Electric Company, which had built 22 power stations by the end of 1887 and by 1889 had bought out another competitor, the Brush Electric Company. Thomson-Houston was expanding its business while trying to avoid patent conflicts with Westinghouse, arranging deals such as coming to agreements over lighting company territory, paying a royalty to use the Stanley transformer patent, and allowing Westinghouse to use their Sawyer–Man incandescent bulb patent. The Edison company, in collusion with Thomson-Houston, managed to arrange in 1890 that the first electric chair was powered with a Westinghouse AC generator, forcing Westinghouse to try to block this move by hiring the best lawyer of the day to (unsuccessfully) defend William Kemmler, the first man scheduled to die in the chair. The War of Currents ended with financiers, such as J. P. Morgan, pushing Edison Electric towards AC and pushing out Thomas Edison. In 1892 the Edison company was merged with the Thomson-Houston Electric Company to form General Electric, a conglomerate with the board of Thomson-Houston in control.

Development and competition
During this period Westinghouse continued to pour funds and engineering resources into the goal of building a completely integrated AC system, obtaining the Sawyer–Man lamp by buying Consolidated Electric Light, developing components such as an induction meter, and obtaining the rights to inventor Nikola Tesla's brushless AC induction motor along with patents for a new type of electric power distribution, polyphase alternating current. The acquisition of a feasible AC motor gave Westinghouse a key patent for his system, but the financial strain of buying up patents and hiring the engineers needed to build it meant development of Tesla's motor had to be put on hold for a while.

In 1890 Westinghouse's company was in trouble. The near collapse of Barings Bank in London triggered the financial panic of 1890, causing investors to call in their loans.  The sudden cash shortage forced the company to refinance its debts. The new lenders demanded that Westinghouse cut back on what looked like excessive spending on acquisition of other companies, research, and patents.

In 1891 Westinghouse built a hydroelectric AC power plant, the Ames Hydroelectric Generating Plant near Ophir, Colorado. The plant supplied power to the Gold King Mine 3.5 miles away. This was the first successful demonstration of long-distance transmission of industrial-grade alternating current power and used two 100 hp Westinghouse alternators, one working as a generator producing 3000-volt, 133-Hertz, single-phase AC, and the other used as an AC motor. At the beginning of 1893 Westinghouse engineer Benjamin Lamme had made great progress developing an efficient version of Tesla's induction motor and Westinghouse Electric started branding their complete polyphase AC system as the "Tesla Polyphase System", announcing Tesla's patents gave them patent priority over other AC systems and their intentions to sue patent infringers.

In 1893, George Westinghouse won the bid to light the 1893 World's Columbian Exposition in Chicago with alternating current, slightly underbidding General Electric to get the contract. This World's Fair devoted a building to electrical exhibits. It was a key event in the history of AC power, as Westinghouse demonstrated the safety, reliability, and efficiency of a fully integrated alternating current system to the American public.

Westinghouse's demonstration that they could build a complete AC system at the Columbian Exposition was instrumental in them getting the contract for building a two-phase AC generating system, the Adams Power Plant, at Niagara Falls in 1895. At the same time, a contract to build the three-phase AC distribution system the project needed was awarded to General Electric. The early to mid-1890s saw General Electric, backed by financier J. P. Morgan, involved in costly takeover attempts and patent battles with Westinghouse Electric. The competition was so costly a patent-sharing agreement was signed between the two companies in 1896.

Other projects
In 1889, Westinghouse purchased several mining claims in the Patagonia Mountains of southeastern Arizona and formed the Duquesne Mining & Reduction Company. A year later he founded what is now the ghost town of Duquesne to use as his company headquarters. He lived in a large Victorian frame house, which still stands, but in disrepair. Duquesne grew to over a 1,000 residents and the mine reached its peak production in the mid-1910s.

With AC networks expanding, Westinghouse turned his attention to electrical power production. At the outset, the available generating sources were hydroturbines where falling water was available, and reciprocating steam engines where it was not. Westinghouse felt that reciprocating steam engines were clumsy and inefficient, and wanted to develop some class of "rotating" engine that would be more elegant and efficient.

One of his first inventions had been a rotary steam engine, but it had proven impractical. The British engineer Charles Algernon Parsons began experimenting with steam turbines in 1884, beginning with a 10-horsepower (7.5 kW) turbine. Westinghouse bought rights to the Parsons turbine in 1885, improved the Parsons technology, and increased its scale.

In 1898 Westinghouse demonstrated a 300-kilowatt unit, replacing reciprocating engines in his air-brake factory. The next year he installed a 1.5-megawatt, 1,200 rpm unit for the Hartford Electric Light Company.

Westinghouse then developed steam turbines for maritime propulsion. Large turbines were most efficient at about 3,000 rpm, while an efficient propeller operated at about 100 rpm. That required reduction gearing, but building reduction gearing that could operate at high rpm and at high power was difficult, since a slight misalignment would shake the power train to pieces. Westinghouse and his engineers devised an automatic alignment system that made turbine power practical for large vessels.

Westinghouse remained productive and inventive almost all his life. Like Edison, he had a practical and experimental streak. At one time, Westinghouse began to work on heat pumps that could provide heating and cooling.

Westinghouse was after a perpetual motion machine, and the British physicist Lord Kelvin, one of Westinghouse's correspondents, told him that he would be violating the laws of thermodynamics. Westinghouse replied that might be the case, but it made no difference. If he couldn't build a perpetual-motion machine, he would still have a heat pump system that he could patent and sell.

With the introduction of the automobile after the turn of the century, Westinghouse went back to earlier inventions and devised a compressed air shock absorber for automobile suspensions.

Personal life, later life, and death

In 1867, Westinghouse met and soon married Marguerite Erskine Walker. They were married for 47 years, and had one son, George Westinghouse III, who had six children.

Westinghouse remained a captain of American industry until 1907, when the financial panic of 1907 led to his resignation from control of the Westinghouse company. By 1911, he was no longer active in business, and his health was in decline.

George Westinghouse died on March 12, 1914, in New York City at age 67. He was initially interred in Woodlawn Cemetery, Bronx, NY then removed on December 14, 1915.  As a Civil War veteran, he was buried in Arlington National Cemetery, along with his wife Marguerite, who survived him by three months. She had also been initially interred in Woodlawn and removed and reinterred at the same time as George.

Labor relations
A six-day workweek was the rule when George Westinghouse inaugurated the first Saturday half holiday in his Pittsburgh factory in 1881.

Honors and awards

In 1918 his former home, Solitude, was razed and the land given to the City of Pittsburgh to establish Westinghouse Park. In 1930, the Westinghouse Memorial, funded by his employees, was placed in Schenley Park in Pittsburgh. Also named in his honor, George Westinghouse Bridge is near the site of his Turtle Creek plant. Its plaque reads:

The George Westinghouse Jr. Birthplace and Boyhood Home in Central Bridge, New York, was listed on the National Register of Historic Places in 1986.

In 1989, Westinghouse was inducted into the National Inventors Hall of Fame.

References

Patents

 , grain and seed winnowers
 , improvements in steam engine and pump
 , improvement in atmospheric car-brake pipes
 , improvement in steam-power-brake couplings
 , improvement in valves for fluid brake-pipes
 , pneumatic pump
 , improvement in fluid-pressure brake apparatus
 , fluid-pressure regulator
 , electrical converter
 , system of electrical distribution
 , system for the protection of railroad-tracks and gas-pipe lines
 , fluid-meter
 , fluid-pressure automatic brake mechanism
 , alternating current electric meter
 , fluid-pressure automatic brake
 , switch and signal apparatus
 , pipe-coupling
 , conduit electric railway
 , draw-gear apparatus for cars
 , incandescent electric lamp
 , electric railway
 , current-collecting device for railway-vehicles
 , elevator
 , electric railway
 , fluid pressure automatic brake
 , draft appliance for railway cars
 , draw-gear and buffing apparatus
 , electric railway system
 , draw-gear and buffing apparatus
 , automatic fluid pressure brake apparatus
 , gearing
 , elastic-fluid turbine
 , electric railway

Notes

Bibliography

 American Society of Mechanical Engineers, Transactions of the American Society of Mechanical Engineers. The electrification of Railways, G. Westinghouse. Page 945+.
 Fraser, J. F. (1903). America at work. London: Cassell. Page 223+.
 Leupp, Francis E. (1918).  George Westinghouse; his life and achievements Boston:  Little, Brown and Company.
 Hubert, P. G. (1894). Men of achievement. Inventors. New York: Charles Scribner's Sons. Page 296+.
 Jonnes, Jill (2003). Empires of Light: Edison, Tesla, Westinghouse, and the Race to Electrify the World. New York: Random House. 
 Klein, Maury (2009). The Power Makers: Steam, Electricity, and the Men Who Invented Modern America. New York: Bloomsbury Press. 
 Moran, Richard (2002). Executioner's Current:  Thomas Edison, George Westinghouse, and the Invention of the Electric Chair New York: Alfred A. Knopf. 
 New York Air Brake Company. (1893). Instruction book. 1893.
 Prout, Henry G. A Life of George Westinghouse.
 Westinghouse Air Brake Company. (1882). Westinghouse automatic brake. (ed., Patents on p. 76.)

External links

 Westinghouse Corporation
 Booknotes interview with Jill Jonnes on Empires of Light: Edison, Tesla, Westinghouse and the Race to Electrify the World, October 26, 2003.
 ANC Explorer – Westinghouse's grave at Arlington National Cemetery

American company founders
American electrical engineers
American inventors
American railroad mechanical engineers
American people in rail transportation
.
1846 births
1914 deaths
Presidents of the American Society of Mechanical Engineers
Fellows of the American Society of Mechanical Engineers
Hall of Fame for Great Americans inductees
IEEE Edison Medal recipients
John Fritz Medal recipients
Burials at Arlington National Cemetery
Union College (New York) alumni
Businesspeople from Schenectady, New York
People from Schoharie, New York
People from Lenox, Massachusetts
Engineers from New York (state)
Military personnel from Schenectady, New York
American people of German descent
19th-century American businesspeople
Union Army non-commissioned officers
Union Navy sailors